Radio 1: Established 1967 is a compilation album consisting of covers recorded for BBC Radio 1 by a number of artists to celebrate the 40th anniversary of the radio station. There are 40 covers recorded by 40 different artists. Each artist chose a song from their assigned year, with the only exception being the Kaiser Chiefs – they were required to cover "Flowers in the Rain" by the Move, as it was the first song played on Radio 1. The album was released on 1 October 2007. The Raconteurs appear as the only band to cover a song, and have one of their own songs covered.

Not all the years correspond to the original year of release, e.g. 1968, 1987, 1990, 1991, 1992, 1997 and 1999. The songs were, however, remixed or re-released in those years.

Track listing

Disc one

* - features backing vocals by Girls Aloud

Disc two

References

External links

BBC Radio 1
2007 compilation albums
Covers albums
2007 in British music